Children at Work is a 1973 Irish short documentary film produced by Louis Marcus. It was nominated for an Academy Award for Best Documentary Short.

References

External links

1973 films
1973 documentary films
1973 short films
1970s short documentary films
Irish-language films
Irish short documentary films